Patric Doonan (George William Doonan) (18 April 1926 in Derby, Derbyshire – 10 March 1958 in London) was a British stage and screen actor. He was the son of comedian George Vincent Doonan and Doris Mary (Nee Endsor) he was the  brother of fellow actor Tony Doonan.

He featured in films of the time such as The Blue Lamp, Train of Events and The Cockleshell Heroes but rarely played the leads. An exception was Wheel of Fate (1953), in which he did have the leading role and top billing. 1953 was probably Doonan's peak year in films, as in that same year he also had good supporting roles in The Net (1953) and The Red Beret (1953).

He played Detective Sergeant Trotter in The Mousetrap at the Ambassadors Theatre in London for three and a half years.

He committed suicide by gas in 1958 at his home in Margaretta Terrace, Chelsea. At the time he was engaged to marry actress Ann Firbank, despite the fact that he was already married to actress Aud Johansen.

In 1994 the singer Morrissey referenced Doonan in the song 'Now My Heart Is Full'.

Filmography

References

External links
 

1925 births
1958 suicides
English male film actors
Suicides in Chelsea
English people of Irish descent
20th-century British male actors
Suicides by gas
1958 deaths